Anageshna is a monotypic moth genus of the family Crambidae described by Eugene G. Munroe in 1956. Its only species, Anageshna primordialis, the yellow-spotted webworm, was described by Harrison Gray Dyar Jr. in 1907. It is found in the US states of Alabama, Arkansas, Arizona, Florida, Georgia, Iowa, Illinois, Kansas, Louisiana, Massachusetts, Maryland, Maine, Minnesota, Missouri, Mississippi, North Carolina, New Hampshire, New Jersey, New York, Ohio, Oklahoma, Pennsylvania, South Carolina, Texas, Virginia and West Virginia.

The wingspan is about 11 mm. Adults are on wing from August to November.

Hosts plants are unknown.

References

External links

 "Species Anageshna primordialis - Yellow-spotted Webworm Moth - Hodges#5176". BugGuide. Retrieved March 10, 2018.
 Solis, M. Alma (May 2008). "Pyraloidea and Their Known Hosts (Insecta: Lepidoptera) of Plummers Island, Maryland". Bulletin of the Biological Society of Washington. pages 88-106. 

Monotypic moth genera
Crambidae genera
Spilomelinae
Moths of North America
Taxa named by Eugene G. Munroe